Helicoverpa hawaiiensis, the Hawaiian bud moth, is a species of moth of the family Noctuidae. It was first described by Altus Lacy Quaintance and Charles Thomas Brues in 1905. It is endemic to Hawaii, where it is known from Kauai, Oahu, Molokai, Maui, Lanai, Hawaii, Nihoa and Necker Island.

Recorded food plants include Gnaphalium and Sida species.

External links
Bishop Museum - Arthropod Checklist

hawaiiensis
Endemic moths of Hawaii
Moths described in 1905